The Calm is an extended play by American hip hop duo Insane Clown Posse that was released on May 17, 2005. This CD is the first after ICP's Jokers Card saga. The title refers to the popular phrase "the calm before the storm". The intro sets up The Tempest, their next CD released on March 20, 2007. It is the group's sixth EP and their 20th overall release.

Album information 
On the cover art, the crop circles make up the letters "ICP" in a logo adopted by the group since the end of the Jokers Cards. Several tracks on the album make references to crop circles

This was the first CD that was completely produced by the ICP themselves. The album, according to Bruce, was "A prelude to the Tempest, this was only the beginning of the end, the coming storm."

Track listing 
 "Intro" — 1:29
 "Rollin' Over" — 3:42
 "Rosemary" — 3:40
 "Crop Circles" — 3:49
 "Deadbeat Moms" (feat. Esham) — 3:07
 "We'll Be Alright" — 4:37
 "Like It Like That" — 3:02
 "Off the Track" — 3:56
 "Rollin' Over (Remix)" [reissue] — 3:40

Chart positions

References 

 Insane Clown Posse official website

2005 EPs
Insane Clown Posse EPs
Psychopathic Records EPs